Shandon is an affluent settlement of houses forming a village on the open sea loch of the Gare Loch in Argyll and Bute, Scotland. Shandon overlooks the Rosneath Peninsula to the west and is bordered by Glen Fruin to the east, which is the site of the Battle of Glen Fruin, one of the last clan battles in Scotland, fought on 7 February 1603, in which an estimated 300 warriors on foot from the MacGregor Clan claimed victory over an estimated 600–800 men from the Colquhoun Clan on horse-back.

Formerly in the county of Dunbartonshire, it developed alongside other similar settlements in the area, in the 19th century, from a hamlet to a fashionable residential area for wealthy Glasgow merchants and several mansion houses still remain. Shandon Castle and Faslane Castle, dating from the Medieval age once occupied prominent positions in the area.

West Shandon House, built in the 1840s by John Thomas Rochead for Robert Napier, often described as 'the father of Clyde shipbuilding' was a prominent landmark and was renowned for housing Napier's extensive art collection. It later became a hydropathic institution,

Since the 1960s, His Majesty's Naval Base Clyde has been based between the outskirts of Shandon and the village of Garelochhead at Faslane, and it occupies the whole of the former grounds of West Shandon House.

Shandon House, designed by Charles Wilson for William Jamieson, became a reform school named St Andrew's, from 1965 until 1986.  It is currently owned by the Ministry of Defence who had plans to make it into accommodation for Royal Marines serving at the Naval Base nearby. It lies behind Faslane Peace Camp, derelect and boarded up.

External links
West Shandon House 
TURKISH baths at Shandon House in the Helensburgh Heritage

References

Villages in Argyll and Bute